Christen Eugen Ager-Hanssen (born July 29, 1962) is a Norwegian internet entrepreneur & venture capitalist. Since the late 1990s, he has been based in London and is a highly controversial private equity professional. Ager-Hanssen was involved in several high-profile M&A deals and has become known for public hostile takeovers. In a Canadian Business cover story, he was described as both Gordon Gekko and a modern-day Viking. In 1999 he became one of Norway's richest citizens. He was reported to be worth over $2.5 billion in 2005.

Ager-Hanssen has also been recognized for his expertise in the Internet. His work to commercialize the Internet in the 1990s included early experiments with search engines, internet infrastructure such as satellite internet access, legal music distribution, banking and financial services, e-mail advertising, banner ads, and pay-per-click advertising. He invests in potential unicorns and media companies through his investment vehicle, Custos, and is the owner of the biggest newspaper in Sweden, the Metro.

Early life 
Christen Ager-Hanssen was born in Halden, Norway. He is the son of Norwegian industrialist and nuclear physicist Henrik Ager-Hanssen (1930–2004) and politician Bjørg Ager-Hanssen. He grew up in Halden, Oslo, and Stavanger before he moved to Sweden where he worked for IBM and Kinnevik in Stockholm.

Business career 
In the early 1980s, Ager-Hanssen was employed by different blue chip computer technology companies such as Burroughs, Digital Equipment Corporation and IBM. In the early 1990s, Ager-Hanssen became a recognized speaker in the field of business process reengineering and legacy information systems.

Investment AB Kinnevik 

Ager-Hanssen is a former Kinnevik AB group executive and recognized as an internet commercialization pioneer. 
Ager-Hanssen was also a senior executive in the Kinnevik group with regards to Tele2 AB and its international expansion. He founded several internet startups together with Investment AB Kinnevik, including Netsys Technology Group, Webware and Polarsearch, one of the first search engines in Scandinavia. He is one of many individuals within the Kinnevik Group that later became entrepreneurs.

Stock trader 
Ager-Hanssen has been an active investor on the Swedish stock exchange who invested in many blue chip companies. In 1999, Dagens Industri described him as a stock trader who made huge profits from being a brilliant stock trader rather than making a profit from his investment portfolio. His investment portfolio was at the time valued at SEK 1.7 billion.

nChain 

In November 2022, Ager-Hanssen was appointed as the CEO of nChain group.

Venture capital

Joint venture with the National Pension Fund of Sweden 
In early 1998, Ager-Hanssen made a bid for NetSys Technology Group, including Webware and Polarsearch, together with the National Pension Fund of Sweden. The bid was successful and ended up with Ager-Hanssen controlling 60% of the company through a newly established joint venture with the National Pension Fund of Sweden. Kinnevik and other shareholders subsequently made a successful exit. In June 1998, Ager-Hanssen made a successful hostile cash bid on the publicly-traded company Verimation AB for SEK 120 million. Ager-Hanssen thereafter delisted the company and integrated the business into the joint venture with the Pension Fund. Verimation had developed one of the first email systems in the world and branded it Memo. Memo had approximately 2.5 million end-user clients at the time and was well established among Fortune 500 companies. Later that year, the NetSys Technology Group was valued at more than USD 388 million.

Just before the dot-com bubble burst in 2000, Ager-Hanssen chose to divest his shares in the joint venture with the Pension Fund. The profit from the divestment was used to fuel his investment activities. The National Pension Fund lost more than SEK 350 million on the investment. Their perceived lack of competence was criticized lengthily in the Swedish press, and they tried to escape the spotlight by blaming Ager-Hanssen. Later that year, NetSys Technology Group was valued to more than USD 388 million.

Cognition 
In 1998, Ager-Hanssen founded a venture capital company called Cognition where he organized most of his Internet-related investment. He employed several high-profile individuals, such as Ulf Sundqvist, former trade minister in Finland, and Gillian Nott, a former financial service authority director. He appointed Ron Sandler as the non-executive chairman who was the former Lloyd's of London chief executive and a former NatWest executive. 

Sandler commented on the appointment in Financial Times: "When I went to NatWest six months ago, the world looked like a certain world. Now it has changed substantially," he said. "In contrast to companies like Cognition, old financial services megaliths appear very slow-moving and quite bureaucratic."

Cognition was valued by HSBC at the beginning of 2000 at approximately GBP 1 billion and planned for an initial public offering (IPO) on the London Stock Exchange. The company never floated because of the dot-com bubble.

Dot-com bubble 
In many articles in Scandinavia, the US, and the UK, Ager-Hanssen was portrayed as a visible symbol for the bubble.

Investments

Media industry

Metro Media House 
Ager-Hanssen´s investment company Custos acquired the Metro from Kinnevik AB in February 2017. The Metro was the original disrupter in the media industry and the world’s first free newspaper launched as early as 1995. Metro is today the biggest newspaper in Sweden. The company has interests in music, fashion, recruitment, health, esports, and loyalty programs. At the time of the acquisition, Ager-Hanssen was quoted, saying: "All of Metro’s business culture is based on surprising the market and doing business that shake up the industry, this fits perfectly with our ambitions in the media sector".

Johnston Press Plc 
In August 2017 Ager-Hanssen was reported to have acquired a strategic stake in the 250-year-old publisher Johnston Press plc and planned to use their digital assets in the same way as Metro, bartering exposure online for equity in startups. Johnston Press plc owns titles such as I, The Yorkshire Post, and The Scotsman. Johnston Press is a leading multimedia business in UK with news brands that reach national, regional, and local audiences. The Group have a portfolio of hundreds of publications and websites. Ager-Hanssen revealed his plan to use Johnston Press' audience of more than 32 million people to help kickstart new ventures. In October 2017 it was reported that activist investor Ager-Hanssen had become the biggest shareholder in Johnston Press plc and that he planned to oust the board and the CEO. Alex Salmond, the former first minister in Scotland was lined up to become chairman of Johnston Press in a plan to disrupt its board. Ager-Hanssen demanded new management, more investment in journalism, and a revamped digital strategy.

Dead hand proxy 
The attempted boardroom coup at Johnston Press was thwarted by a controversial “poison pill” defense. Ager-Hanssen branded Johnston Press’ dead hand proxy as “a grotesque abuse of fiduciary duty”. Johnston Press is believed to be the first example of an activist coming up against such a poison pill in the UK. Ager-Hanssen commented on the poison pill in The Telegraph: The poison pill cynically deprives shareholders of their fundamental right to change the board as they see fit. That power has been stolen from them. This is nothing short of corporate theft of power in which only the directors can decide who replaces them. The board seeks to play shareholder and bondholder interests off of one another in the hope that the balance of power can remain in the hands of a few cozy fat cats.In the beginning of May 2018, the CEO of Johnston Press, Ashley Highfield, stepped down and Ager-Hanssen declared that he would increase his stake in the 250-year-old publisher.

Airline and leisure industry 
In 2005 Ager-Hanssen and John Robert Porter invested together in the airline and travel industry. They acquired, among others, a controlling stake in the almost bankrupt publicly listed company FlyMe Europe AB (FLY-B.SK). FlyMe Europe was a low-cost carrier based in Gothenburg that aimed to be one of the leading low-cost carriers in Europe.

FlyMe Europe 
Ager-Hanssen and Porter's first step in achieving their goal of being a leading low-cost carrier in Europe was to convince the owner of the biggest Danish carrier Sterling European Airlines A/S and Maersk Air, Icelandic billionaire Palmi Haraldsson, to join their plan. Haraldsson agreed and acquired a strategic holding in FlyMe Europe; Haraldsson had already invested DKK 500 million in Sterling European Airlines and an undisclosed amount in Maersk Air and Iceland Express, and saw an opportunity to bring it all together in a listed holding company such as FlyMe Europe. They changed the board and raised SEK 272 million after securing a majority stake and voting control in FlyMe to fuel the company's international expansion and to position it for consolidation in the airline industry.

Low-cost Carrier Consolidation 
In late 2005, Haraldsson accepted an offer from the FL Group to divest his holding in Sterling Airlines (the merged entity of Sterling European Airlines and Maersk) for DKK 1.5 billion. The FL Group was led by Hannes Smárason, who had at the time a 16 percent strategic holding in the second-largest low-cost carrier in Europe, EasyJet, as well as holdings in American Airlines.

Ager-Hanssen and Haraldsson continued the consolidation discussion with Smárason and the FL Group's majority owner Baugur represented by Icelandic billionaire Jón Ásgeir Jóhannesson. The plan was for Sterling Airlines to do a "reverse takeover" based on a DKK 2 billion valuation on Sterling Airlines A/S. After some preliminary due diligence of Sterling in June and July 2006 FlyMe's board and Ager-Hanssen decided to not proceed with the acquisition of Sterling.

The decision to not acquire Sterling disturbed Haraldsson and Smárason's take-over plan, and made it impossible for Ager-Hanssen and Porter to continue a business relationship with Haraldsson. In September 2006, they acquired Haraldsson's shares in FlyMe Europe, which led to a battle between the airlines with no winners.

Both airlines later went bankrupt because the owners would not support the companies with additional capital.

Global Supply Systems 
Ager-Hanssen and Porter also had a controlling stake in the English-based freight operator Global Supply Systems (GSS). GSS was launched in 2001 as a British all-cargo carrier whose principal business was to provide aircraft on long-term leases to other airlines on an ACMI (Aircraft, Crew, Maintenance, Insurance) basis. GSS was a joint venture with Atlas Air Worldwide, who operates the world's largest fleet of modern Boeing 747 all-cargo aircraft and was a 49% partner in GSS. In 2007 Porter and Ager-Hanssen's GSS signed a five-year contract with British Airways (BA), which at the time was described as the largest-ever freighter investment made by BA with total operating costs of over USD 1 billion. Porter and Ager-Hanssen controlled 51% of GSS through Riverdon Ltd.

In 2007, FlyMe acquired a strategic minority stake in GSS with the plan to become the first airline in the world to produce low-cost long-haul flights from Scandinavia to the US and Thailand. GSS was divested in 2009.

Ticket 
Ager-Hanssen and Porter continued to invest in the leisure industry and acquired a strategic stake in Ticket, one of the leading Scandinavian travel agencies and publicly listed company, and changed their board through a hostile takeover. The company was divested in 2008.

Telecom & technology industry 
Ager-Hanssen has had several investments in the telecom industry. Among the more well-known is his early investment in Glocalnet, which is owned today by Telenor. Ager-Hanssen's Cognition invested SEK 80 million together with Brummer & Partner and Nomura Holdings. The main part of the placement (SEK 50 million) was done by Ager-Hanssen. He later sold his share in Glocalnet to Inter-Ikea.

Other telecom investments held by Ager-Hanssen included Utfors, a broadband operator today also owned by Telenor, and investments in Tele2 and Millicom.

Oil industry 

Ager-Hanssen invested in 2005 together with Porter in Nordic Oil. The company was chaired by the founder and former CEO of Statoil, Arve Johnsen. The company aimed to expand both upstream and downstream. Some of the assets of the company included 105 gas stations in Sweden- branded pump and a lubricant retail business in Scandinavia. In 2006 Nordic Oil signed a deal with the Hinduja Group to re-establish the Gulf brand to the Scandinavian market and planned to rebrand all of its gas stations. Ager-Hanssen and Porter divested the business in 2007.

Business partners 
Ager-Hanssen works with blue chip executives, politicians, and billionaires such as John Robert Porter, who had made a fortune from Demon, Britain's first internet provider as well as from his divestment of Verifone to Hewlett Packard in 1997. Ager-Hanssen and Porter have several business interests together and have been business partners since the late 1990s.

Bibliography 
Christen Ager-Hanssen and Jenny Hedelin: HQgate - den okända dramatiken bakom Sveriges mest uppmärksammade bankkrasch - English title: HQgate - the unknown drama behind Sweden's most notable bank crash, Ekerlids, Stockholm 2017,

References 

1962 births
Living people
Angel investors
British mass media owners
British newspaper publishers (people)
Burroughs Corporation people
IBM employees
Internet pioneers
Norwegian company founders
Norwegian media executives
People from Halden
Private equity and venture capital investors
Venture capitalists